Lentinellus micheneri is a species of wood-inhabiting fungus in the family Auriscalpiaceae. It was first described in 1853 by mycologist Miles Berkeley and Moses Ashley Curtis as Lentinus micheneri. David Pegler transferred it to the genus Lentinellus in 1983. Like all species in its genus, it is inedible.

References

External links

Russulales
Fungi described in 1853
Fungi of Europe
Fungi of North America
Inedible fungi